Indian Springs is a small set of springs after which a nearby mining settlement was named in the 19th century, in Nevada County, California, located near Rough and Ready.
It had a post office from 1858 to 1871, and again from 1892 until 1893.  Indian Springs was listed on a map as of 1949.

References

Reference bibliography 

Former settlements in Nevada County, California
Former populated places in California